Cyndra MacDowall (born April 20, 1953) is a Canadian visual artist known for her photography and writing.

Biography 
Cyndra MacDowall was born April 20, 1953, in Toronto, Ontario. She has lived and worked in Toronto, Montreal, and currently Windsor, Ontario. She maintains studios in Toronto and Windsor, Ontario. Her work has been exhibited since 1987.

Career 
MacDowall received a Bachelor of Art Education from Queen's University in 1977 and a Master of Fine Arts in Photography from Concordia University in 1995. She was a photography professor at the University of Windsor's School of Creative Arts (SoCA). Her work is included in various public and private collections, including the Art Gallery of Windsor and the Ryerson Image Centre.

Style, technique, and reception 
MacDowall's work focuses on questions related to relationships of space (architectural and/or geographical), history, memory, gender, and identity. Her work often combines sculptural forms with photography.

Significant works 
 Eclipse (1991) was acquired by the National Gallery of Canada for the Canadian Museum of Contemporary Photography's collection.

References

Further reading 
 Road Trip Diary/Journal de Route: An Extract from the Installation
 Art and the Cosmos: Eclipses and Aurora pg. 4, Cyndra MacDowall, Eclipse (1991)

External links 
 Official Website

1953 births
Living people
20th-century Canadian women artists
21st-century Canadian women artists
Canadian photographers
20th-century Canadian non-fiction writers
21st-century Canadian non-fiction writers
Artists from Toronto
20th-century Canadian women writers
21st-century Canadian women writers
Writers from Toronto
20th-century Canadian photographers
21st-century Canadian photographers
Queen's University at Kingston alumni
Concordia University alumni